Mohd Hamsani Bin Ahmad (born 25 February 1976) is a Malaysian retired professional footballer who played as a goalkeeper. He was also a former member of Malaysia national football team, making appearances against Japan and Hong Kong in 2004.

References

External links
 

Bersara bukan penghalang untuk berbakti pada Selangor 

Living people
Malaysian footballers
Malaysia international footballers
Perak F.C. players
Negeri Sembilan FA players
Selangor FA players
1976 births
People from Negeri Sembilan
Malaysian people of Malay descent
Association football goalkeepers